is a Japanese actress.

Filmography

Movies
Hinokio (2005), Sumire
Kamen Rider The First (2005), Miyoko Harada
Zoo (2005)
Helen the Baby Fox (2006), Misuzu Yajima
Wangan Midnight (2009)
Pink and Gray (2016)
21st Century Girl (2019)
Leaving the Scene (2019)
Pornographer: Playback (2021)
My Father's Tracks (2021), Mayu Kitamura
Mado (2022)
My Happy Marriage (2023), Hana

Dramas
 Ichiban Taisetsu na Hito wa Dare Desu ka (NTV, 2004)
 Gekidan Engimono Atarashii Ikimono (Fuji TV, 2005)
 Shikaku Ukeoinin (TV Tokyo, 2007, ep1)
 Sunadokei (TBS, 2007)
 Maō (TBS, 2008)
 Shikaku Ukeoinin 2 (TV Tokyo, 2008, ep1)
 Hissatsu Shigotonin 2009 (TV Asahi, 2009, ep1)
 Keishicho Sosa Ikka 9 Gakari 4 (TV Asahi, 2009, ep10)
 Meitantei no Okite (TV Asahi, 2009, ep4)
 Samurai High School (NTV, 2009)
 Nene: Onna Taikōki (TV Tokyo, 2009), Ohatsu
 Code Blue 2 (Fuji TV, 2010, ep3)
 Yamato Nadeshiko Shichi Henge (TBS, 2010, ep1)
 Omukae desu (NTV, 2016)
 Ultraman Geed (Tsuburaya Productions, 2017), Arie Ishikari

References

External links 

Kobayashi Ryoko Official Japanese Site

1989 births
Living people
Japanese actresses
Horikoshi High School alumni